The United States of America v Nolan [2015] UKSC 63 was a 2015 judgment of the Supreme Court of the United Kingdom concerning the application of the Trade Union and Labour Relations (Consolidation) Act 1992 to public administrative establishments.

Facts
Mrs Nolan worked at a watercraft repair centre in Hythe, Hampshire operated by the United States Army. In 2006 the base was closed down and Mrs Nolan was dismissed for redundancy on the day before it closed. Mrs Nolan brought a case based on the failure of the United States to consult with an employee representative when proposing to dismiss her.

Judgment

Employment Tribunals
Both the Employment Tribunal and Employment Appeal Tribunal found in favour of Mrs Nolan and granted an order for remuneration for a one-month period.

Court of Appeal
Under the preliminary ruling procedure the Court of Appeal asked the Court of Justice of the European Union whether the duty to consult with an employee representative arose on a 'proposal' or a 'decision' to close the base. The European Court declined jurisdiction over the issue.

Supreme Court
The United States appealed to the Supreme Court on two key grounds. Firstly that the Trade Union and Labour Relations (Consolidation) Act 1992 should not apply to public administrative establishments and secondly that the Secretary of State had exceeded the powers conferred by section 2 of the European Communities Act 1972 by going further than EU law required. These appeals were dismissed on the basis that just because legislation does not contain a clear exemption does not mean that the courts should read any such exemption into the legislation. On the second ground it was held that because the Trade Union and Labour Relations (Consolidation) Act 1992 had established a unified domestic regime the Secretary of State had not exceeded his powers when making the 1995 regulations.

Lord Carnwath dissented on this point and noted the importance of limiting the ministerial power to legislate outside of the normal parliamentary process.

Significance

The case will now return to the Court of Appeal where it will be decided whether the duty to consult arises when there is a proposal to make a business decision that will lead to redundancies or when that decision has been made. On this point it has been argued that:

See also
United Kingdom labour law
Redundancy in United Kingdom law
2015 Judgments of the Supreme Court of the United Kingdom
European Union law

References

External links
Supreme Court judgment
Video of the judgment

Supreme Court of the United Kingdom cases
2015 in British law
2015 in case law
United Kingdom labour law
Termination of employment
United Kingdom–United States relations
Hythe, Hampshire
History of the United States Army